Louis Charles Moeller (5 August 1855 – 1930) was an American genre painter.

Biography
He was born in New York City. He was the son of a decorative painter, with whom he served a three years' apprenticeship. He then studied painting in New York with E. M. Ward and Will Hicok Low, and in Munich with Feodor Dietz and Frank Duveneck. His meager resources obligated him to return from Munich back home to New York in 1883, where he again devoted himself to decorative painting.

The year of his return, he submitted A Girl in a Snow-Storm to the National Academy of Design's annual exhibition. The following year he submitted Puzzled, and was awarded the First Hallgarten Prize. He was elected an Associate of the National Academy in 1884, and elected an Academician in 1895. He died in Weehawken, New Jersey, in 1930.

Works
Among his paintings are:
 “An Interior” (1886)
 “A Doubtful Investment”
 "A Good Start in Life" (1909)
 “A Siesta”
 “Bluffing”
 ”Discussing the News”
 ”Card Players” (ca. 1875)
 ”Elderly Couple Seated at Table”
 ”Interior of an Artist's Studio”
 "Jolly Topers" (ca. 1880)
 ”Legal Advise”
 “Morning News”
 “Road to School” (1883)
 “Short Measure” (1885)
 “Stubborn”
 "The Bibliomaniacs"
 "The Chemist"
 "Tea Party" (1905)
 ”Tending the Cows”
 ”Unknown Man”
 "Interested"

Gallery

Notes

References
 
 
  This work in turn cites:
 Michael David Zellman, 300 Years of American Art
Attribution

External links

 
 
A more complete list of paintings is available from the Art Inventories Catalog, Smithsonian American Art Museums.

1855 births
1930 deaths
American genre painters
19th-century American painters
American male painters
20th-century American painters
19th-century American male artists
20th-century American male artists